Hernan Diaz (born 1973) is a writer. His 2017 novel In the Distance was a finalist for the Pulitzer Prize for Fiction, as well as the PEN/Faulkner Award for Fiction. He also received a Whiting Award.

Personal life 
Although Diaz was born in Argentina and raised in Sweden, he has spent most of his life living in the United States.

He received a doctorate of philosophy from New York University.

Career 
Diaz has received fellowships from the New York Public Library's Cullman Center for Scholars and Writers, The Rockefeller Foundation Bellagio Center, MacDowell, Yaddo, and the Ingmar Bergman Estate.

Diaz has published two novels, which have been published in more than 20 languages. His essays and short stories have been published in The Paris Review, Granta, Playboy, The Yale Review, and McSweeney's.

Aside from his writing, he is the associate director of the Hispanic Institute for Latin American and Iberian Cultures at Columbia University, and serves as the managing editor of the Spanish-language journal Revista Hispánica Moderna.

In 2019, he won a Whiting Award, which provides "$50,000 each to ten diverse emerging writers of fiction, nonfiction, poetry, and drama." The award is provided "based on the criteria of early-career achievement and the promise of superior literary work to come."

His second novel, Trust, was longlisted for the 2022 Booker Prize. It was named one of the "10 Best Books of 2022" by The Washington Post and The New York Times.

Selected works

Trust (2022) 
Trust was awarded the Kirkus Prize following the publication by Riverhead Books On May 3, 2022.

In the Distance (2017) 

In the Distance was published on October 10, 2017 by Coffee House Press.

Publishers Weekly, Feminist Press, PANK, and The Paris Review named it one of the top books of 2017, and Lit Hub named it one of "The 20 Best Novels of the Decade."

The book has received the following accolades:

 William Saroyan International Prize for Writing for Fiction (2018)
 VCU Cabell First Novelist Award (2018)
 Prix Page America Award (2018)
 New American Voices Award (2018)
 Pulitzer Prize for Fiction finalist (2018)
 PEN/Faulkner Award for Fiction finalist (2018)

Publications

Novels 
 In the Distance (2017),  
 Trust (2022),

Nonfiction books 

 Borges, Between History and Eternity (2012),

Short stories 

 "The Wife of the Lion" (2018) in The Kenyon Review
 "1,111 Emblems" (2018) in Playboy
 "‘I Am Going to Speak to You about Anxiety’" (2018) in Granta
 "The Stay" (2018) in The Paris Review

Essays 

 "The Heart of Fiction: Storytelling, experience, and truth" (2021) in The Yale Review
 "Tove Jansson on Writer’s Block" (2019) in The Paris Review
 "Tove Jansson’s 'The Island'"  (2019) in The Paris Review]'
 "Who Gets to Be a Mad Scientist?" (2018) in The Paris Review "On Frankenstein, A Monster of a Book" (2018) in The Paris Review "We stigmatize accents, but language belongs to everyone" (2018) on PBS NewsHour "On Making Oneself Less Unreadable" (2017) in The Paris Review "If I Had a Sense of Beauty" (2017) in The Paris Review "Monument" on Kadist''

References 

Living people
Columbia University faculty
New York University alumni
Kirkus Prize winners
1973 births
Argentine emigrants to the United States
21st-century American novelists
21st-century Argentine novelists
American male novelists
Argentine male novelists
Alumni of King's College London